The Portugal women's national football team represents Portugal in international women's football competition. The team is controlled by the Portuguese Football Federation (FPF) and competes as a member of UEFA in various international football tournaments such as the FIFA Women's World Cup, UEFA Women's Euro, the Summer Olympics, and the Algarve Cup.

History

The Portuguese women's team historically was one of the weakest in Western Europe since its formation. In recent years however the team has made major strides, qualifying for the newly expanded UEFA Women's Euro 2017, marking the team's first appearance in a major tournament. Despite ultimately finishing last in their group, the team put in a respectable performance, picking up a win in their second match against a Scottish side  which had been favored to beat them, and only losing to England by one goal. 

After finishing a distant third in their qualifying group for the 2019 FIFA Women's World Cup behind Italy and Belgium and failing to qualify, the Portuguese team then looked forward to trying to repeat their achievement of four years prior by qualifying for UEFA Women's Euro 2022, which they eventually did under quite unusual circumstances. After a strong group stage campaign in which Portugal won all its games except for the two games against group winner Finland, including beating the heavily favored top seed Scotland both home and away, the team reached the play-off stage where they were drawn against Russia. The team came agonizingly close as they narrowly lost the first game in Portugal 0–1 before managing a goalless draw in the second leg in Russia. As a result Russia originally qualified for the Euro, but due to the 2022 Russian invasion of Ukraine all Russian representative teams were banned from competition by FIFA, thus giving Portugal a reprieve as they took Russia's place in Group C of the Women's Euro. Portugal is placed in group C with Sweden, the Netherlands and Switzerland as opponents. They were eliminated in the first round, finishing last with a point obtained thanks to a draw against Switzerland (2–2 after being 0–2 down and having dominated the game overall), and two defeats against the favorites of the group (a close one 2–3 against the Dutch title holders after having recovered a two-goal handicap for a while, then a much heavier defeat 0–5 against Sweden).
Portugal qualified for their first World Cup at the 2023  edition after beating Cameroon 2-1 at the International playoff Final.

Team image

Nicknames
The Portugal women's national football team has been known or nicknamed as the "".

Results and fixtures

 The following is a list of match results in the last 12 months, as well as any future matches that have been scheduled.

Legend

2022

2023

Official Portugal results and fixtures

Coaching staff

Current coaching staff

Manager history

 Francisco Neto (2014–)

Players

Caps and goals may be incorrect.

Current squad
The following list is the final squad for 2023 FIFA Women's World Cup qualification  in February 2023.
Updated list on 17 Feb 2023.

Recent call-ups
 The following players were named to a Portugal squad in the last 12 months.
This list may be incomplete.

Previous squads

UEFA European Women's Championship
 UEFA Women's Euro 2017 squad

Algarve Cup

 Algarve Cup 2013 squad
 Algarve Cup 2014 squad
 Algarve Cup 2015 squad
 Algarve Cup 2016 squad

 Algarve Cup 2017 squad
 Algarve Cup 2018 squad
 Algarve Cup 2019 squad
 Algarve Cup 2020 squad

Records

 Active players in bold, statistics correct as of 17 Feb 2023.

Most capped players

Top goalscorers

Competitive record

FIFA Women's World Cup

*Draws include knockout matches decided via penalty shoot-out.

UEFA European Women's Championship

*Draws include knockout matches decided on penalty kicks.

Algarve Cup

The Algarve Cup is an invitational tournament for national teams in women's association football hosted by the Portuguese Football Federation (FPF). Held annually in the Algarve region of Portugal since 1994, it is one of the most prestigious and longest-running women's international football events and has been nicknamed the "Mini FIFA Women's World Cup."

Torneio Internacional de Futebol Feminino

References

External links
Official website 
FIFA profile

 
European women's national association football teams
national